Paul David Skinner  (born 1944) is a British businessman, and the former chairman of Rio Tinto Group.

Early life
Skinner was born in 1944 and earned a law degree from Cambridge University, followed by attending Manchester Business School.

Career
He first worked for Shell as a student in 1963, rising to managing director, but lost out to Sir Philip Watts in the contest to become its chairman.

In November 2003, Skinner was appointed chairman of Rio Tinto Group, succeeding Sir Robert Wilson. In 2009, he was succeeded by Jan du Plessis.

Honours
Skinner was appointed CBE in 2014.

Personal life
Skinner is married, with two sons.

References

1944 births
Living people
Alumni of the University of Cambridge
Commanders of the Order of the British Empire
Alumni of the Manchester Business School
Shell plc people
People of Rio Tinto (corporation)